Byron O. Bell Jr. (June 9, 1914 – October 18, 2008) was an American professional basketball player. He played for the Oshkosh All-Stars in the National Basketball League for one game during the 1938–39 season and scored four points.

References

1914 births
2008 deaths
American men's basketball players
Basketball players from Wisconsin
Centers (basketball)
Oshkosh All-Stars players
Sportspeople from Neenah, Wisconsin
University of Wisconsin–Milwaukee alumni
Wisconsin Badgers men's basketball players